Frank Charles Thomas (19 January 1905 – 6 May 2001) was an Australian rules footballer who played with Hawthorn in the Victorian Football League (VFL) and Sturt in the South Australian National Football League (SANFL)

Notes

External links 

1905 births
2001 deaths
Australian rules footballers from Victoria (Australia)
Hawthorn Football Club players
Sturt Football Club players